Bleialf transmitter is a facility of the Deutsche Telekom AG on the Black Man mountain at Bleialf, Germany for FM- and TV-broadcasting. It uses as antenna tower a 224 metre tall guyed steel-tube mast.

References

External links
 https://maps.google.com/maps?t=k&ie=UTF8&z=18&ll=50.254722,6.359167&spn=0.001468,0.003616&om=1

Radio masts and towers in Germany
Communication towers in Germany